Angel Face is a short film written and directed by Cecile Cinco.

Premise

A tragic love triangle surrounding Angela, played by Patricia Javier, and her husband, David, played by Joseph Will. Angela and David's happy marriage is turned into a not so living hell when their lives are shattered by Angela's new friend.

Cast
 Patricia Javier as Angela
 Joseph Will as David
 Grace Roberts as Jesse
 Robert Walcher III as the Reporter
 Bill Ascherfeld as the Realtor

References

External links
 
 Angel Face official website

2008 short films